The Texoma AVA  is an American Viticultural Area located in north central Texas, on the south side of Lake Texoma and the Red River that forms the border with the state of Oklahoma.   The Texoma region is where 19th century viticulturist Thomas Volney Munson discovered that grafting Vitis vinifera grapevines onto native American varieties of vine rootstock resulted in vines that were resistant to phylloxera.  The technique saved the European wine industry when it was brought to France, which was suffering its first phylloxera epidemic.  The region was not designated an American Viticultural Area until 2005.

Wineries
When it was established in 2005, only four wineries were located within the Texoma AVA.  In 2006, this number increased to six.

See also
 Texas wine

References

American Viticultural Areas
Geography of Texas
Texas wine
2005 establishments in Texas